SR9 may refer to:

Heckler & Koch SR9, a semi-automatic rifle
Ruger SR9, a semi-automatic pistol
List of highways numbered 9